Khukaria is a village in the Bhopal district of Madhya Pradesh, India. It is located in the Berasia tehsil.

Demographics 
According to the 2011 census of India, Khukaria had 202 households. The effective literacy rate (i.e. the literacy rate of population excluding children aged 6 and below) was 69.74%.

References 

Villages in Berasia tehsil